Norm Beckham (2 May 1903 – 30 April 1983) was an Australian rules footballer who played with Fitzroy in the Victorian Football League (VFL).

Notes

External links 
		

1903 births
1983 deaths
Australian rules footballers from Victoria (Australia)
Fitzroy Football Club players